Marcus Annius Flavius Libo was a Roman Senator who lived in the second half of the 2nd century and first half of the 3rd century. He was consul ordinarius in AD 204 with Lucius Fabius Cilo as his senior colleague.

Libo was a Patrician and came from Hispania Baetica. His grandfather was Marcus Annius Libo, who was made suffect consul in 161. His father of the same name was a legatus of Syria and may have been poisoned, possibly by his cousin, Lucius Verus. Libo was related to Lucius Verus through their mutual ancestor, Marcus Annius Verus, who was consul three times, and by marriage to Emperor Antoninus Pius, who married his grandfather's sister.

References

Prosopographia Imperii Romani, A 648

Senators of the Roman Empire
Imperial Roman consuls
Romans from Hispania
2nd-century births
3rd-century deaths
3rd-century Romans
Libo, Marcus Flavius
Flavii